Joachim Schepke (8 March 1912 – 17 March 1941) was a German U-boat commander during World War II. He was the seventh recipient of the Knight's Cross of the Iron Cross with Oak Leaves.

Schepke is credited with having sunk 36 Allied ships. During his career, he gained notoriety among fellow U-boat commanders for exaggerating the tonnage of ships sunk.

Career
Schepke joined the Reichsmarine in 1930. In 1934, he was assigned to the newly created U-boat arm, and in 1938 he commanded . After 5 patrols in U-100 she was heavily damaged on 17 March 1941 by depth charges from HMS Walker and  while attacking Convoy HX 112. U-100 was forced to surface and was detected on radar and rammed by Vanoc. Schepke and most of the crew died.

If true, this would have made him the third skipper to have sunk over 200,000 tons. While he definitely sank 36 ships, he was known throughout the fleet to exaggerate his tonnage claims; other U-boat men came to use the expression "Schepke tonnage" in reference to this. Nonetheless,  at one point Schepke ranked first in number of ships sunk, and was recommended by Admiral Dönitz for the Knight's Cross with Oak Leaves.

Awards
 Iron Cross (1939)
 2nd Class 
 1st Class (27 February 1940)
 U-Boat War Badge (1939) (3 January 1940 – 30 April 1940)
 Knight's Cross of the Iron Cross with Oak Leaves
 Knight's Cross on 24 September 1940 as Kapitänleutnant and commander of U-100
 7th Oak Leaves on 1 December 1940 as Kapitänleutnant and commander of U-100

References

Citations

Bibliography

 
 
 
 Fuhren, Franz (1943). Kapitänleutnant Schepke erzählt. Mit einem Geleitwort von Großadmiral Dönitz. Minden: Köhler Verlag.
 
 
 Schepke, Joachim (1940). U-Boot-Fahrer von heute. Erzählt und gezeichnet von einem U-Boot-Kommandanten. Berlin, Deutscher Verlag 1940
 
 

 

1912 births
1941 deaths
People from Flensburg
People from the Province of Schleswig-Holstein
U-boat commanders (Kriegsmarine)
Recipients of the Knight's Cross of the Iron Cross with Oak Leaves
Kriegsmarine personnel killed in World War II
Reichsmarine personnel
People lost at sea
Military personnel from Schleswig-Holstein